Carla Heredia Serrano (born 10 February 1991) is an Ecuadorian chess player and Woman Grandmaster (WGM, 2013).

Biography
Heredia has won nine Ecuadorian Girl's Chess Championships in different age groups. She three times participated in World Girls' Junior Chess Championships (2009-2011). In 2009, she won the American Girl's Chess Championship in U20 age group and Ecuadorian Women's Chess Championship, and has become the winner of the FIDE Women's World Chess Championship South American Zonal Tournament and got the right to participate in the finals. In 2010 Heredia participated in Women's World Chess Championship by knock-out system and in the first round lost to Hou Yifan.

Heredia played for Ecuador in the Women's Chess Olympiads:
 In 2008, at fourth board in the 38th Chess Olympiad (women) in Dresden (+2, =2, -5),
 In 2012, at second board in the 40th Chess Olympiad (women) in Istanbul (+3, =1, -5),
 In 2014, at first board in the 41st Chess Olympiad (women) in Tromsø (+2, =3, -4),
 In 2016, at second board in the 42nd Chess Olympiad (women) in Baku (+5, =2, -3),
 In 2018, at second board in the 43rd Chess Olympiad (women) in Batumi (+4, =3, -3).

In 2010, she was awarded the FIDE Woman International Master (WIM) title and received the FIDE Woman Grandmaster (WGM) title three year later.

References

External links
 
 
 

1991 births
Living people
Ecuadorian female chess players
Chess woman grandmasters
Chess Olympiad competitors
Sportspeople from Quito
21st-century Ecuadorian women